The Mississauga Board of Trade (MBOT) is a non-profit organization representing the business interests of 1500 Mississauga corporations.

External links
 
 Journalist and Writer with Training

Organizations established in 1978
Chambers of commerce in Canada
1978 establishments in Ontario